Enzo Carra (8 August 1943 – 2 February 2023) was an Italian journalist and politician. A member of The Daisy, the Democratic Party, and the Union of the Centre, he served in the Chamber of Deputies from 2001 to 2013.

Carra died in Rome on 2 February 2023, at the age of 79.

References

1943 births
2023 deaths
Italian journalists
Deputies of Legislature XIV of Italy
Deputies of Legislature XV of Italy
Deputies of Legislature XVI of Italy
Christian Democracy (Italy) politicians
Italian People's Party (1994) politicians
Democracy is Freedom – The Daisy politicians
Democratic Party (Italy) politicians
Union of the Centre (2002) politicians
Politicians from Rome